The 1987–88 Omani League was the 14th edition of the top football league in Oman. Fanja SC were the defending champions, having won the previous 1986–87 Omani League season. Fanja SC emerged as the champions of the 1987–88 Omani League with a total of 49 points.

Teams
This season the league had 12 teams.

Stadia and locations

League table

Top level Omani football league seasons
1987–88 in Omani football
Oman